Golden Rule is the first boat to engage in environmental direct action in the world. It is currently operated by Veterans for Peace. As of summer of 2017, Golden Rule is actively sailing to promote nuclear non-proliferation and disarmament.

History
The boat was designed by Hugh Angelman and constructed from 1956 to 1958 in Costa Rica. She was originally constructed with sapele and purpleheart. Restoration has been done using, among other south American tropical woods, Hymenaea courbaril.

In 1958, four men associated with the Quaker religion sailed toward Enewetok atoll in the Marshall Islands aboard Golden Rule with the goal of preventing atmospheric nuclear weapons testing. The US Coast Guard stopped the vessel in Honolulu, arresting her skipper, Albert Bigelow, who once served as lieutenant commander in the United States Navy. Different people owned the vessel throughout the years. She sank twice: once in the early 1970s and again in March, 2010. She has been restored since. In July 2015, she had relaunched from Humboldt Bay, California, her present home dock. She continues to sail on a peace mission to promote non-violence and to spread an anti-nuclear message to the general public. Her stops are accompanied by public events to inform the public. In the summer of 2017, she sails from Eureka, California down the full length of the California coast to San Diego with visits up the Sacramento River to the state capital.

Veterans for Peace 

The Golden Rule was rebuilt between 2010 and 2015 by a team led by Veterans For Peace.  It has since sailed up and down the West Coast of the US, to Hawai’i and back. 

Vets for Peace began a project in September 2022 to sail a "Great Loop" from Chicago to Miami to Maine and back again, with many stops on the way.  They plan to complete the tour in December 2023.

See also
Albert Bigelow
Phoenix of Hiroshima
Rainbow Warrior

References

External links 
The Golden Rule Project website

 Anti-nuclear protests
 Anti–nuclear weapons movement
 1958 ships
 Individual sailing vessels